Marques "Joyo" Terrell Bolden (born April 17, 1998) is an American-born Indonesian professional basketball player who last played for the Salt Lake City Stars of the NBA G League. He played college basketball for the Duke Blue Devils.

High school career
At DeSoto High School, Bolden supplied per-game averages of 23.4 points, 10.2 rebounds and 2.6 blocked shots as a senior, helping his team win the Texas Class 6A state title, while earning Texas Mr. Basketball and TABC 6A Player of the Year honors. He had eight points and five rebounds in the 2016 Jordan Brand Classic and tallied 13 points as well as seven boards at the McDonald's All-American Game the same year.

Ranked 8th overall in the 2016 high school class by Scout.com, 11th overall by Rivals and 16th overall by ESPN, Bolden committed to Duke in May 2016.

College career
Bolden had to sit out the first eight games of the 2016–17 season due to a leg injury, before making his debut against Maine on December 3, 2016, scoring seven points and five rebounds. He missed the NCAA Tournament due to illness and averaged 1.5 points and 1.1 rebounds (24 games) as a freshman.

As a sophomore, Bolden averaged 3.9 points and 3.6 rebounds per game, playing behind Wendell Carter Jr. and Marvin Bagley III. On June 25, 2018, coach Mike Krzyzewski said he thought he would be one of the best big men in the upcoming season. As a junior in 2018–19, he saw action in 35 games (21 starts) with the Blue Devils, averaging 5.3 points, 4.5 rebounds and 1.7 blocks in 19.1 minutes per game. In April 2019, Bolden announced his participation in the 2019 NBA draft.

Professional career

Cleveland Cavaliers / Canton / Cleveland Charge (2019–2021)
After going undrafted in the 2019 NBA Draft, Bolden joined the Cleveland Cavaliers in the 2019 NBA Summer League. On October 19, 2019, the Cavaliers released Bolden, later to add him to the roster of their NBA G League affiliate, the Canton Charge.

On January 30, 2020, the Cleveland Cavaliers announced that they had signed Bolden to a 10-day contract. Bolden was reported to have returned to the Canton Charge after the contract expired.

On November 30, 2020, the Cleveland Cavaliers announced that they had added Bolden, and the contract was converted to a two-way contract on December 19. On February 24, 2021, the Cavaliers waived Bolden, and two days later on February 26, he was re-acquired by the Charge.

Salt Lake City Stars (2021–2023)
On September 28, 2021, Bolden signed with the Utah Jazz. He was waived prior to the start of the season and added to the roster of their G League affiliate, the Salt Lake City Stars.

On September 22, 2022, Bolden signed an Exhibit 10 contract with Milwaukee Bucks. He was waived on October 16 prior to the start of the regular season. 

On October 23, 2022, Bolden rejoined the Salt Lake City Stars on their training camp roster.

On January 25, 2023, Bolden was placed on the injured list, ending his season with the Salt Lake City Stars.

National team career
Playing at the 2016 Nike Hoop Summit, Bolden scored three points and pulled down two rebounds in 13 minutes of action for Team USA. He attended a training camp of the 2017 USA Basketball Men's U19 World Cup Team but was cut before the start of the tournament.

In July 2021, Bolden was naturalized into an Indonesian citizen. He helped the national team win its first ever Southeast Asian Games gold medal in 2022. In 2022 FIBA Asia Cup, he brought Indonesia for the qualification to quarter finals and he recorded statistical averages of highest minutes per game (38.0), highest efficiency per game (28.5), highest blocks per game (2.8), second highest points per game (21.8), third highest double-doubles (3), and fourth highest rebounds per game (11.3) among all participated players during the tournament.

Career statistics

NBA

Regular season

|-
| style="text-align:left;"|
| style="text-align:left;"|Cleveland
| 1 || 0 || 3.0 ||  ||  ||  || 2.0 || .0 || 1.0 || .0 || .0
|-
| style="text-align:left;"|
| style="text-align:left;"|Cleveland
| 6 || 0 || 4.8 || .333 ||  || .625 || 1.0 || .0 || .3 || .3 || 1.2
|- class="sortbottom"
| style="text-align:center;" colspan="2"|Career
| 7 || 0 || 4.6 || .333 ||  || .625 || 1.1 || .0 || .4 || .3 || 1.0

NBA G League

Regular season

|-
| style="text-align:left;"| 2019–20
| style="text-align:left;"| Canton
| 38 || 27 || 18.9 || .600 || .182 || .736 || 6.7 || 1.2 || 0.3 || 1.5 || 9.7
|- class="sortbottom"
| style="text-align:left;"| 2020–21
| style="text-align:left;"| Canton
| 10 || 10 || 23.9 || .507 || .000 || .867 || 7.5 || 1.0 || .0 || 2.1 || 9.2
|- class="sortbottom"
| style="text-align:left;"| 2021–22
| style="text-align:left;"| Salt Lake
| 20 || 20 || 31.7 || .519 || .395 || .619 || 9.2 || 1.2 || 1.0 || 1.9 || 12.3
|- class="sortbottom"
| style="text-align:center;" colspan="2"| Career
| 68 || 57 || 23.4 || .554 || .345 || .709 || 7.6 || 1.1 || 0.5 || 1.7 || 10.4

College

|-
| style="text-align:left;"| 2016–17
| style="text-align:left;"| Duke
| 24 || 1 || 6.5||  .457 || – || .625 || 1.1 || .1 || .1 || .3 || 1.5
|-
| style="text-align:left;"| 2017–18
| style="text-align:left;"| Duke
| 29 || 2 || 12.9 || .615 || – || .593 || 3.6 || .6 || .3 || 1.0 || 3.9
|-
| style="text-align:left;"| 2018–19
| style="text-align:left;"| Duke
| 35 || 21 || 19.0 || .579 || .000 || .726 || 4.5 || .5 || .5 || 1.7 || 5.3
|- class="sortbottom"
| style="text-align:center;" colspan="2"| Career
| 88 || 24 || 19.6 || .573 || .000 || .685 || 3.3 || .4 || .3 || 1.1 || 3.8

National Team

|-
! colspan=14 | Southeast Asian Games 2021
|-
| style="text-align:left;background:gold;"| 2022 
| style="text-align:left;"| Indonesia
| 2 || 1 || 19.5||  .538 || .200 || 1.000 || 6.0 || 2.5 || - || 1.0 || 11.0
|-
! colspan=14 | FIBA Asia Cup 2022
|-
| style="text-align:left;"| 2022
| style="text-align:left;"| Indonesia
| 4 || 4 || 38.3 || .578 || .438 || .875 || 11.3 || 0.3 || 0.5 || 2.8 || 21.8

References

External links
 Duke Blue Devils bio
 USA Basketball bio

1998 births
Living people
American emigrants to Indonesia
Basketball players from Dallas
Canton Charge players
Centers (basketball)
Cleveland Cavaliers players
Duke Blue Devils men's basketball players
Indonesian men's basketball players
Indonesian people of African-American descent
McDonald's High School All-Americans
Naturalised citizens of Indonesia
Salt Lake City Stars players
Undrafted National Basketball Association players
Competitors at the 2021 Southeast Asian Games
Southeast Asian Games gold medalists for Indonesia
Southeast Asian Games medalists in basketball